Ozuna is a Spanish surname. Notable people with the surname include:

Ozuna (born 1992), stage name of Juan Carlos Ozuna Rosado, Puerto Rican-Dominican reggaeton and Latin trap singer 
Erick Ozuna López (born 1990), Dominican footballer
Marcell Ozuna (born 1990), Dominican baseball outfielder
Pablo Ozuna (born 1974), Dominican baseball utility player
Sunny Ozuna, lead singer of Sunny & the Sunglows
Jorge Radhamés Zorrilla Ozuna (born 1954), Dominican general and politician

See also
Osuna (disambiguation)

Spanish-language surnames